Raffl is a 1984 Austrian drama film directed by Christian Berger. It was entered into the 14th Moscow International Film Festival. The film was screened for the Directors' Fortnight at the 1984 Cannes Film Festival.

Cast
Lois Weinberger as Franz Raffl
Dietmar Schönherr as Pastor
 as Raffl's wife
Barbara Viertl as Raffl's foster daughter

Lothar Dellago
Arthur Brauss
Franz Mössmer
Isolde Ferlesch

See also
The Judas of Tyrol (1933)

References

External links

1984 films
1984 drama films
Austrian drama films
Films set in the Alps
Napoleonic Wars films
1980s German-language films